"Live Wire" is a 1964 dance single released by Motown girl group Martha and the Vandellas.

Background
The song was produced by Holland–Dozier–Holland under the same gospel-pop confection of their earlier hit singles "(Love Is Like a) Heat Wave" and "Quicksand". The song explained why the narrator can't come up with words to tell her lover that she was through with him because when she looks at him, she feels that he is "like a bolt of lightning" and that he's a "live wire".

Cash Box described it as "a red rocker that should move way out in no time flat" demonstrating the "fabulous hit-making excitement that showed up on 'Heat Wave.'"

Personnel
Lead vocals by Martha Reeves
Background vocals by Rosalind Ashford and Annette Beard
Produced by Brian Holland and Lamont Dozier
Written by Brian Holland, Lamont Dozier and Edward Holland, Jr.
Instrumentation by the Funk Brothers
Andrew "Mike" Terry: baritone saxophone solo

Chart performance
The song failed to hit the Top 40 of the pop chart (peaking at #42) and reached #11 on Cashbox's R&B singles chart (the Billboard R&B chart was suspended until January 1965).

References

1964 singles
Martha and the Vandellas songs
Songs written by Holland–Dozier–Holland
Motown singles
1964 songs
Gordy Records singles
Song recordings produced by Lamont Dozier
Song recordings produced by Brian Holland